1335 Demoulina, provisional designation , is a stony Florian asteroid from the inner regions of the asteroid belt, approximately 7 kilometers in diameter. Discovered by Karl Reinmuth at Heidelberg Observatory in 1934, the asteroid was named after Prof. Demoulin, a Belgian astronomer at Ghent University. It has a slower-than average spin rate of nearly 75 hours.

Discovery 

Demoulina was discovered on 7 September 1934, by German astronomer Karl Reinmuth at the Heidelberg-Königstuhl State Observatory in southwest Germany. Six nights later, it was independently discovered by Belgian astronomer Eugène Delporte at Uccle Observatory on 13 September 1934. The Minor Planet Center only recognizes the first discoverer.

Orbit and classification 

Demoulina is a member of the Flora family, a giant asteroid family and the largest family of stony asteroids in the asteroid belt. However, it is a non-family asteroid of the main belt's background population when applying the Hierarchical Clustering Method to its proper orbital elements.

It orbits the Sun in the inner asteroid belt at a distance of 1.9–2.6 AU once every 3 years and 4 months (1,225 days; semi-major axis of 2.24 AU). Its orbit has an eccentricity of 0.15 and an inclination of 3° with respect to the ecliptic. The body's observation arc begins with its official discovery observation at Heidelberg in 1934.

Physical characteristics 

Demoulina is an assumed S-type asteroid.

Rotation period 

In February 2006, a rotational lightcurve of Demoulina was obtained from photometric observations by American astronomers Lawrence Molnar and Melissa Haegert at the Calvin–Rehoboth Observatory in New Mexico. Lightcurve analysis gave a rotation period of 74.86 hours with a brightness amplitude of 0.78 magnitude. While not being a slow rotator, Demoulinas period is significantly longer than that for most asteroids. Its high brightness amplitude also indicates that it has an irregular or elongated shape.

Other photometric lightcurves which are based on a single night of observation are rated poorly.

Diameter and albedo 

According to the survey carried out by the NEOWISE mission of NASA's Wide-field Infrared Survey Explorer, Demoulina measures between 6.35 and 7.684 kilometers in diameter and its surface has an albedo between 0.2073 and 0.26.

The Collaborative Asteroid Lightcurve Link assumes an albedo of 0.24 – derived from 8 Flora, the parent body of the Flora family, and calculates a diameter of 7.47 kilometers based on an absolute magnitude of 12.8.

Naming 

This minor planet was named after Prof. Demoulin, a Belgian astronomer at Ghent University. The official naming citation was mentioned in The Names of the Minor Planets by Paul Herget in 1955.

References

External links 
 Asteroid Lightcurve Database (LCDB), query form (info )
 Dictionary of Minor Planet Names, Google books
 Asteroids and comets rotation curves, CdR – Observatoire de Genève, Raoul Behrend
 Discovery Circumstances: Numbered Minor Planets (1)-(5000) – Minor Planet Center
 
 

001335
Discoveries by Karl Wilhelm Reinmuth
Named minor planets
19340907